This is a list of notable members of the science and engineering honor society Sigma Xi.

Academia
 Blake R. Van Leer United States Army officer and president of Georgia Institute of Technology
 Eduardo Suger Swiss-Guatemalan educator and founder of Galileo University
 Jeremy Howick Canadian-British interdisciplinary researcher and founding director of the Stoneygate Centre for Excellence in Empathic Healthcare.

Aerospace
Ali Baghchehsara Vice President of Solar Maximum Co. and coauthor of Electric Space: Space-Based Solar Power Technologies & Applications
 Irmgard Flügge-Lotz  developed the theory of discontinuous automatic control; first female engineering professor at Stanford University and first female engineer elected a Fellow of the American Institute of Aeronautics and Astronautics.
Jack Parsons - American rocket engineer, rocket propulsion researcher, chemist, and a leading member of the OTO occult group.

Anthropology
Eugenie Scott leading critic of young earth creationism and intelligent design

Biology

Botany
Don G. Despain flora of Yellowstone National Park specialist
Edwin Earle Honey (1891–1956) American plant pathologist and mycologist
Barbara McClintock cytogenetics specialist, Nobel Prize in Physiology or Medicine winner
Peter H. Raven President Emeritus of the Missouri Botanical Garden
 Julia Warner Snow American systematic phycologist and instructor.

Entomology
Anna Botsford Comstock insect illustrator, leader in the nature study movement, and one of the first four female members of Sigma Xi

Molecular biology
Francis Crick co-discoverer of DNA molecule, Nobel Prize in Physiology or Medicine winner
Jennifer Doudna - pioneer in CRISPR gene editing, Nobel Prize in Chemistry winner
James D. Watson co-discoverer of the structure of DNA, Nobel Prize in Physiology or Medicine winner

Zoology
Roger Arliner Young first African American woman to receive a PhD in zoology
William Rees Brebner Robertson - American zoologist and early cytogeneticist who discovered the chromosomal rearrangement named in his honour, Robertsonian translocation
Florence Wells Slater - American entomologist

Chemistry
Arthur W. Adamson inorganic photochemistry pioneer
Bettye Washington Greene  Dow Chemical
Narayan Sadashiv Hosmane Humboldt Prize winner
Ray R. Irani current chairman and former chief executive officer of Occidental Petroleum
Irving Langmuir research helped develop the incandescent light bulb, Nobel Prize in Chemistry winner
Tobin J. Marks National Medal of Science laureate
Donna Nelson President of Oklahoma Sigma Xi Chapter, American Chemical Society (ACS) President (2016), Breaking Bad science advisor (2008-2013).
Linus Pauling Nobel Prize in Chemistry winner
Harry Snyder President of Minnesota Sigma Xi Chapter
Kelly O. Sullivan Sigma Xi President, 2012-2013 
Theodor Svedberg Nobel Prize in Chemistry winner
Harold Urey discovery of deuterium, Nobel Prize in Chemistry winner
Khairat Muhammad Ibne Rasa - Winner of the Potter Prize, Brown University 1959

Computer science
Alan Sherman Cryptologia editor
Michael Waterman computational biology specialist

Engineering

Electrical engineering
Supriyo Datta Director of NASA Institute for Nanoelectronics and Computing
Alan V. Oppenheim Developed the field of digital signal processing and member of the National Academy of Engineering

Mechanical engineering
Catherine Mohr  surgical roboticist and faculty of Stanford School of Medicine

Mathematics
Albert Turner Bharucha-Reid probability and Markov chain theorist
James McMahon delegate to First Convention of Sigma Xi
John von Neumann Enrico Fermi Award winner
Cornelia Strong professor of mathematics and astronomy

Physics
John C. Cook played a crucial role in establishing the field of ground-penetrating radar
Richard J. Duffin mathematical physicist noted for contributions to electrical transmission theory and geometric programming
Albert Einstein developed the general theory of relativity, Nobel Prize in Physics winner
Richard Feynman Nobel Prize in Physics winner
Enrico Fermi Chicago Pile team member, Nobel Prize in Physics winner
Andrea Ghez - astrophysicist, Nobel Prize in Physics winner
Mustapha Ishak Boushaki gravitational lensing and universe expansion physicist, University of Texas at Dallas
Ernest Merritt Dean of the Graduate School, Cornell University
Rahul Pandit condensed matter physicist, Shanti Swarup Bhatnagar laureate
Andrea Prosperetti multiphase flow researcher

Psychology 
 Marie Skodak Crisseydevelopmental psychologist, served as president of two divisions of the American Psychological Association

Honorary members
Natalie Angier journalist
Deborah Blum Pulitzer Prize-winning journalist
Sherwood Boehlert member of the United States House of Representatives
George Brown, Jr. member of the United States House of Representatives
Malcolm Browne photojournalist
Clinton Sumner Burns  civil engineer  
William D. Carey publisher of Science
Claudia Dreifus journalist
Dennis Flanagan founding editor of Scientific American
Ira Flatow Science Friday host
Al Gore Vice President of the United States, Nobel Peace Prize winner
Sidney Harris cartoonist
Brian Hayes science writer
Theodore Hesburgh President Emeritus of the University of Notre Dame
Jamie Hyneman MythBusters co-host
Bill Kurtis television journalist
Bob McDonald journalist
Dennis Overbye science writer
David Price member of the United States House of Representatives
David Quammen science writer
Paul Raeburn science writer
Floyd M. Riddick Parliamentarian of the United States Senate
Adam Savage MythBusters co-host
David Sington BBC journalist
Walter S. Sullivan New York Times journalist
Robert Dillard Teer Jr. Real Estate Developer and General Contractor
Stewart Udall Secretary of the Interior during John F. Kennedy and Lyndon B. Johnson administrations

References

External links
Sigma Xi's "Members in the News"

Scientific societies based in the United States
Honor societies